United Nations Security Council Resolution 33, adopted on August 27, 1947, accepted some and rejected some of the recommendations of the General Assembly about changing the wording of the rules of procedure for the Council.

The resolution passed with ten votes to none; Australia abstained.

See also
List of United Nations Security Council Resolutions 1 to 100 (1946–1953)

References
Text of the Resolution at undocs.org

External links
 

 0033
 0033
August 1947 events